WTGF (90.5 FM) is a radio station broadcasting a Southern Gospel format. Licensed to Milton, Florida, United States, the station serves the Pensacola area.  The station is currently owned by, and is a ministry of, Faith Baptist Ministries.

History
The station went on the air as WTGF on 1993-05-14.  According to FCC records, the station was silent, and its calls were deleted (as "DWTGF") from 2004-08-31 until 2004-10-21.

References

External links

Radio stations established in 1993
1993 establishments in Florida
Southern Gospel radio stations in the United States
TGF